Marc O’Polo is a Swedish-German fashion label founded in 1967 by Rolf Lind, Göte Huss and Jerry O'Sheets.

History

Founding
Marc O’Polo was founded in Stockholm in 1967 by Rolf Lind, Göte Huss and Jerry O'Sheets.

In 1972, the label introduced logo-imprinted, cotton t-shirts and launched a unisex sweatshirt. The first Marc O’Polo store opened in Düsseldorf in 1979.

Expansion

In 1997 the company's original distribution partner for Germany, Werner Böck, expanded his shareholdings and formed Marc O’Polo International GmbH, which is responsible for all company operations, including design and production to distribution and marketing. The same year Marc O’Polo relocated its headquarters from Stockholm to Stephanskirchen in the district of Rosenheim.

Marc O’Polo then began to make bags and small leather goods from year 1997 and launched beachwear and children's clothing in 1998. In 2003, a flagship Marc O’Polo store opened in Munich's Theatinerstraße and the company launched its online store. 

Since 2008, and the opening of the first Marc O’Polo store in Asia (in Singapore Changi Airport), the company has invested in international expansion. The first Marc O’Polo stores in China opened in 2014.

Partnerships

In 2013, Marc O’Polo introduced a new claim, ‘Follow your Nature,’ and began featuring celebrities in its campaigns. The actor Jeff Bridges was featured in campaigns for the company's menswear collections. In 2013 and Spring 2014, the campaign introduced Amber Valletta, followed by Uma Thurman in Fall/Winter 2014 in campaigns photographed by Mario Sorrenti.

For the Fall/Winter 2013 and Spring/Summer 2014 seasons, Marc O’Polo co-created collections with the fashion illustrator Garance Doré, and for the Fall/Winter 2014 season with the graffiti artist André Saraiva.

Since 2011, the company has sponsored the Marc O’Polo Design Award which honors innovative approaches to design among the students of Beckmans College of Design in Stockholm, Sweden.

Marc O'Polo has also supported specific creative ventures by a range of international artists, such as the 2013 publication of a bilingual (German-English) edition of photographer Werner Eisele's chronicle of auto racing in the '60s and '70s, Formula 1 Legends; floral artist Thierry Boutemy's installation ‘A Piece of Art’ exhibited in the Marc O'Polo store in Brussels during the 2014 Art Brussels contemporary art fair; the 2014 photo::vienna exhibition of contemporary Austrian photography at Vienna’s Museum of Applied Arts (MAK); and artist Stefan Gbureck's 2014 motorcycle ride from Berlin to Rio de Janeiro.

External links
Official site

References

Clothing brands of Sweden
Clothing brands of Germany
1967 establishments in Sweden
20th century in Stockholm